Vera Farmiga is an American actress, director, and producer. She began her career on stage as an understudy in Ronald Harwood's 1996 play Taking Sides on Broadway. The following year, she starred in the Off-Broadway play Second-Hand Smoke (1997) by Mac Wellman. Farmiga made her film debut in the drama-thriller Return to Paradise (1998). She then had supporting roles in the romantic drama film Autumn in New York (2000), the crime drama film The Opportunists (2000), and the action thriller film 15 Minutes (2001). Farmiga's breakthrough role came in 2004, when she was cast in the drama film Down to the Bone. For her performance, she won the Sundance Film Festival Special Jury Prize for Acting and was nominated for the Independent Spirit Award for Best Female Lead. She then starred in the political thriller The Manchurian Candidate (2004) and the crime thriller Running Scared (2006).

Farmiga's role in The Departed (2006), which won the Academy Award for Best Picture, brought her to worldwide prominence. She subsequently had a lead role in the romantic drama Never Forever (2007). In 2008, Farmiga starred in the historical drama The Boy in the Striped Pyjamas, for which she won the British Independent Film Award for Best Actress. That same year, she appeared in the political drama Nothing But the Truth, for which she was nominated for the Critics' Choice Movie Award for Best Supporting Actress. She then starred in the psychological thriller Orphan (2009), and gained critical acclaim for her role in the comedy-drama Up in the Air (2009), for which she was nominated for the Academy Award for Best Supporting Actress.

In 2011, Farmiga made her directorial debut with the drama Higher Ground, for which she was nominated for the Gotham Award for Best Breakthrough Director and the Satellite Award for Best Actress – Motion Picture. Also in 2011, she starred in the science fiction film Source Code. The following year, she appeared in the action thriller Safe House (2012) and the comedy-drama Goats (2012). In 2013, Farmiga starred as Lorraine Warren in the horror film The Conjuring, for which she was nominated for the MTV Movie Award for Best Scared-As-Shit Performance. The following year, she starred in the drama The Judge (2014). In 2016, Farmiga reprised her role as Lorraine Warren in the horror sequel The Conjuring 2 and co-starred in the satirical comedy Special Correspondents. In 2018, she appeared in the action thriller The Commuter and the biographical drama The Front Runner. In 2019, Farmiga starred in the science fiction thriller Captive State, the monster film Godzilla: King of the Monsters, and the horror sequel Annabelle Comes Home.

From 2013 to 2017, she starred in the A&E drama-thriller series Bates Motel as Norma Louise Bates. Her performance in the role earned her the 2013 Saturn Award for Best Actress on Television, and nominations for the Primetime Emmy Award for Outstanding Lead Actress in a Drama Series (2013), the Critics' Choice Television Award for Best Actress in a Drama Series (2013–2015), and the TCA Award for Individual Achievement in Drama (2013). She also served as a producer on the series. In 2019, Farmiga starred in the miniseries When They See Us. For her performance, she received a nomination for the Primetime Emmy Award for Outstanding Supporting Actress in a Limited Series or Movie.

In 2021, Farmiga portrayed Eleanor Bishop in Marvel’s Hawkeye.

Film

Television

Stage

See also
 List of awards and nominations received by Vera Farmiga

References

External links
 
 
 

Farmiga, Vera
American filmographies